Erycilla is a genus of flies in the family Tachinidae. Some authors place this genus as a synonym of Allophorocera.

Species
E. ferruginea (Meigen, 1824)

References

Diptera of Europe
Exoristinae
Tachinidae genera